Rara Airport , also known as Talcha Airport, is a domestic airport located in Chhayanath Rara serving Rara National Park in Karnali Province in Nepal.

History
The airport was constructed in 1975 but was only blacktopped in 2015.

Airlines and destinations

Accidents and incidents
On 26 May 2010, a Tara Air DHC-6 Twin Otter took off from Birendranagar Airport in Surkhet, heading for Rara Airport with 18 passengers and 3 crew on board. At 10 am, the aircraft had to make an emergency landing at Birendranagar Airport, after its cabin door suddenly opened five minutes after take-off. Tara Air officials said that the cabin attendant managed to lock the door immediately after it opened, to avert any possible mishaps.
On 21 November 2011, a Makalu Air Cessna 208B Grand Caravan took off from Surkhet Airport, en route to Rara Airport. Upon touchdown at Rara, the aircraft skidded off the runway and hit a rock, damaging the front of the aircraft—four of the 11 occupants were injured.

References

External links
. From the Nepali Times channel. Accessed: 31 March 2012

Airports in Nepal
1975 establishments in Nepal
Buildings and structures in Mugu District